Deqen may refer to:

Dêqên Tibetan Autonomous Prefecture (Diqing), in Yunnan, China
Dêqên County (Deqin), in Yunnan, China
Dêqên, Dagzê County, township in Dagzê County, Lhasa
Dêqên, Doilungdêqên County, township in Doilungdêqên County, Lhasa